Receptor-type tyrosine-protein phosphatase epsilon is an enzyme that in humans is encoded by the PTPRE gene.

Function 

The protein encoded by this gene is a member of the protein tyrosine phosphatase (PTP) family. PTPs are known to be signaling molecules that regulate a variety of cellular processes including cell growth, differentiation, mitotic cycle, and oncogenic transformation. Two alternatively spliced transcript variants of this gene have been reported, one of which encodes a receptor-type PTP that possesses a short extracellular domain, a single transmembrane region, and two tandem intracytoplasmic catalytic domains; Another one encodes a PTP that contains a distinct hydrophilic N-terminus, and thus represents a nonreceptor-type isoform of this PTP. Studies of the similar gene in mice suggested the regulatory roles of this PTP in RAS related signal transduction pathways, cytokines induced SATA signaling, as well as the activation of voltage-gated K+ channels.

Interactions 

PTPRE has been shown to interact with KCNB1.

References

Further reading